Kulghuti is a village located in Gaighata block of the North 24 Parganas district in the state of West Bengal, India.

References 

Villages in North 24 Parganas district